Berlandia is a genus of East African huntsman spiders that was first described by R. de Lessert in 1921.  it contains two species, found in Africa: B. longipes and B. tenebricola.

See also
 List of Sparassidae species

References

Araneomorphae genera
Sparassidae
Spiders of Africa